Russian South Korean or South Korean Russian may refer to:
Russia–South Korea relations
Russians in South Korea
South Koreans in Russia, see Koryo-saram
Multiracial people of Russian and South Korean descent